Agnieszka Dygacz (born 18 July 1985 in Chorzów) is a Polish race walker. She competed in the 20 km kilometres event at the 2012 Summer Olympics.

Competition record

References

External links 
 
 
 

Sportspeople from Chorzów
Polish female racewalkers
1985 births
Living people
Olympic athletes of Poland
Athletes (track and field) at the 2012 Summer Olympics
Athletes (track and field) at the 2016 Summer Olympics
World Athletics Championships athletes for Poland
Competitors at the 2009 Summer Universiade